Ishwarganj Bisweswari Government Pilot High School is a secondary school in Ishwarganj Upazila, Mymensingh District, Bangladesh. It was founded in 1916 by Kishore Roy Chowdhury. There are approximately 1,500 students currently enrolled.

Admission
Generally, admission is permitted in class six once a year. There is no eligibility criteria to sit the admission test. Students who perform well in the test are usually admitted.

Campus
The school has two main academic buildings. One is four storeyed and other is two storeyed. It has a big playground where students play and enjoy games at afternoon. From the school, one can see the small river Kanchamatia. On the other side of the school there is a big pond like lake, local people call it Muktijoddha Pukur.

Educational facilities and miscellaneous
The school has many educational facilities including a science laboratory, a workshop, a computer lab, and a library. Physics, chemistry, and biology lessons are normally conducted in the science laboratory. The physics lab contains different kinds of scientific equipment including simple pendulum, internal combustion engine model, calorimeter etc. The chemistry lab contains all equipment required for a secondary science education. Different kinds of chemicals also available here. Biology lab also has human skeleton, different kinds of anesthetic, different specimen of animals and plants reserved with chloroform. The average GPA 5 holder from every academic batch is about 100.

Student activities
Students attend a morning assembly everyday where physical exercise is performed, especially in winter season. An annual sports day is dedicated every year where different traditional game and music are performed. Some students attend to Science Olympiad, Mathematical Olympiad and consequently win prizes and recognition. There is a good tradition of arranging debate competition among students and also inter school level.

Notable alumni
Abdus Sattar, Former member of parliament
Shah Nurul Kabir Shahin, Former member of parliament
Abdul Hye Mashreki, One of the three greatest folk poets in Bengali literature alongside Jasimuddin and Bande Ali Mia

See also
Mymensingh Zilla School
Vidyamoyee Govt. Girls' High School
Mukul Niketon High School

References

High schools in Bangladesh
Schools in Mymensingh District
1916 establishments in India
Educational institutions established in 1916